My Animal is a 2023 romance horror film directed by Jacqueline Castel from a screenplay written by Jae Matthews.

The film had its world premiere at the 2023 Sundance Film Festival during the Midnight section.

Cast
Bobbi Salvör Menuez as Heather
Amandla Stenberg as Jonny
Stephen McHattie as Henry, Heather's werewolf father
Heidi von Palleske as Patti, Heather's human mother
Cory Lipman as Rick, Jonny's boyfriend
Joe Apollonio
Dean McDermott
Scott Thompson as Marcel, Jonny's controlling father

Production
In 2019, the project was selected to participate at the Frontières production market during the Fantasia International Film Festival.

The principal photography took place in Timmins, Ontario, Canada.

Release
My Animal had its world premiere at the 2023 Sundance Film Festival, on January 22, 2023, during the Midnight section. Prior to the premiere, the worldwide distribution, excluding Canada, was acquired by Paramount Pictures.

Reception
On the review aggregator website Rotten Tomatoes, the film holds an approval rating of 83% based on 30 reviews, with an average rating of 6.2/10.

References

2020s erotic thriller films
Canadian erotic thriller films
2020s teen fantasy films
LGBT-related romantic drama films
LGBT-related horror films
Canadian werewolf films
Canadian LGBT-related films
2020s Canadian films
2023 LGBT-related films